Henri Auguste Jules Patey (9 September 1855, Paris – 17 May 1930, Paris) was a French sculptor, medallist and coin engraver.

Life
Patey studied sculpture with Henri Chapu and engraving and medal making with Jules-Clément Chaplain. He was admitted to the École nationale supérieure des Beaux-Arts in 1873. In 1875, he won the second Prix de Rome for medal engraving and in 1881 he won the first Grand prix de Rome, also for medal engraving. He won further prizes in 1886 (third), 1887 (second) and 1894 (first). At the Universal Exhibition of 1889 he won a bronze medal. He produced many portrait medals, not only of clients, but also of relatives and friends. He also authored decorations and patterns.

In 1898, he became a knight of the Légion d'honneur. He was a member of the Académie des Beaux-Arts from 1913.

Henri-Auguste Patey died in 1930.

Works
He succeeded Jean Lagrange as chief engraver of the Paris mint in 1896, a position he held until his death. He used a torch as his privy mark. In this position, Patey designed the nickel 25 Centimes 1903. This piece was generally rejected. It was the first copper-nickel coin in France. The white metal was taken for silver and the coin confused with the 1 franc, in spite of a completely different design. Coins with a different design and shape dated 1904 and 1905 were not accepted either. He did not design any other French coins after this double disappointments. Copper-nickel coins succeeded only in 1914, when holed coins were produced.

Patey was also responsible for the following French colonial and foreign coins:
 Cameroon: 50 centimes, 1 franc, 2 francs 1924-1926
 French Indo China: 5 centimes 1923-1943
 Guadeloupe: 50 centimes, 1 franc 1903, 1921
 Kingdom of Serbs, Croats and Slovenes: 50 para, 1 dinar, 2 dinara, 20 dinara 1925
 Thailand: 1 baht 1908
 Togo: 50 centimes, 1 franc, 2 francs 1924-1926

And possibly coins for the Comoros, Syria and Lebanon struck at the Paris mint.

References

External links 
 

Artists from Paris
1855 births
1930 deaths
École des Beaux-Arts alumni
Members of the Académie des beaux-arts
19th-century engravers
20th-century engravers
French engravers
Prix de Rome for engraving
20th-century French printmakers
Chevaliers of the Légion d'honneur